Gerhart Kraaz (1909–1971) was a German artist and illustrator.

Gerhart Kraaz was born in Berlin in 1909 and died in Königstein/Taunus in 1971.

References

1909 births
1971 deaths
German illustrators